Zafar Sareshwala is an Indian businessman, owner of Parsoli Corporation, and former chancellor of Maulana Azad National Urdu University. A member of the strict Tablighi Jamaat branch of Islam, Sareshwala has gained considerable public attention for being a strident supporter and a close confidant of Narendra Modi, the current Prime Minister of India.

Biography
Sareshwala is a mechanical engineer by training and considered an expert in Islamic banking and finance. In 2001, he organised protests in Delhi against the burning of copies of the Qur'an by Hindus. His family businesses incurred huge losses in the 2002 Gujarat riots, and he was part of a group of Indian expatriates considering filing against Modi at the International Court of Justice for his role in the violence. Sareshwala and Modi subsequently settled their differences, with Sareshwala and his brother meeting cordially with Modi on a visit to London in 2003, and developing close business and political ties since then. Sareshwala's decision to move his family back to India from London in 2005 was said to be on the urging of Modi himself, with Modi asking: "Will you continue serving the British as a slave?" Since Modi's political ascent to Prime Minister, Sareshwala claims that only by engaging with Modi and the BJP will the interests of Muslims in Gujarat be advanced, and cites multiple examples of political achievements resulting from his links with Modi. However, this position has brought intense criticism upon Sareshwala from fellow Muslims and human rights activists, with many critics accusing him of opportunism, and one commentator dubbing him "Modi's PR man in the Muslim world". Sareshwala receives much hate mail comparing him with Indians who aided the British during the colonial era.

In 2010 Sareshwala, along with Parsoli and its other directors, was barred from the capital market by the Securities and Exchange Board of India (SEBI) for share fraud, for a seven-year period. SEBI took this action against Parsoli and its directors after establishing that the company's directors had defrauded shareholders and transferred shares to themselves. In July 2013 Parsoli's broker registration was cancelled in connection with further violations.

Sareshwala's appointment in 2015 as Chancellor of the Maulana Azad National Urdu University was strongly criticised by Muslim groups and other groups affiliated with the university, who alleged that the appointment was a reward for Sareshwala's support of Prime Minister Narendra Modi and the BJP. Sareshwala's term as chancellor of the university ended in May 2018.

Zafar Sareshwala has three children.

References

Year of birth missing (living people)
Living people
Indian Muslims
Businesspeople from Hyderabad, India
Politicians from Hyderabad, India